Visa requirements for Nicaraguan citizens are administrative entry restrictions by the authorities of other states placed on citizens of Nicaragua. As of 2 July 2019, Nicaraguan citizens had visa-free or visa on arrival access to 126 countries and territories, ranking the Nicaraguan passport 44th in terms of travel freedom (tied with Tuvalu and Ukraine) according to the Henley Passport Index.

Visa requirements map

Visa requirements
Visa requirements for holders of normal passports traveling for tourist purposes:

Territories and disputed areas
Visa requirements for Nicaraguan citizens for visits to various territories, disputed areas and restricted zones:

See also

Visa policy of Nicaragua
Nicaraguan passport

References and Notes
References

Notes

Nicaragua
Foreign relations of Nicaragua